Usurp Synapse was a screamo band from Lafayette, Indiana. The group combined fast and frantic grindcore influenced drumming and  guitar work, and raw screams.

History
Usurp Synapse formed in 1998 in Lafayette, Indiana.  Their line up changed somewhat frequently during their initial run. Antonio Leiriao, their second vocalist, originally lived in New York before he moved to Indiana in 1999 to join the group. Most of their music was released through split albums with other artists, perhaps their most famous split being their Just Do It! record with Hassan I Sabbah, which included razor blades. Unconventional marketing methods such as this was utilized by the band throughout their run.

In 2000, they toured the United States along with Jeromes Dream, who they also released a split with, and Racebannon from May to June. This would become the only major nationwide tour for the band. In 2001, they announced plans to do another tour in the United States, Europe, and Japan over the summer. They also announced plans to release a split with Pg. 99, a split with Mara'akate shaped as Indiana, and what would have been the band's first full-length album, which was under the working title of ATM Diatribe. That same year Mike Dixon (who previously worked in the band Rep Seki) joined Usurp Synapse as the keyboardist.

Later that same year it was announced that all plans, except for ATM Diatribe, had to be cancelled. ATM Diatribe was initially supposed to be released on compact disc and vinyl through Happy Couples Never Last, however that too was cancelled when the band broke up in the spring of 2001. The tracks from the ATM Diatribe sessions, along with the rest of the band's recorded discography, was eventually released on Disinformation Fix, a discography compilation released through Alone Records.

In 2008, the group released A Vile Contamina through their Myspace page for free. The EP included material recorded during their reformative period.

Former members of the band would later join other projects such as Fax Arcana and The Drago Miette, both of whom are now disbanded. Antonio Leirao would move on to the indie rock band Thin Fevers and is now a funk DJ.  Chance now works as a session drummer in New York and was one of the many drummers who played in The Boredoms 2008 88 Boadrums event.

Band members

Final lineup
John Scott - Vocals, keyboards (1998-2001, 2004)
Don Kirkland - Guitar (1998-2001, 2004)
Tony Dryer - Bass  (1999-2001, 2004)
Travis Chance - Drums (1998-2001, 2004)

Past members
Mike Dixon - Keyboards (2001)
Antonio Leiriao - Vocals (1999 - 2001)
Brandon Harris - Guitar (1999 - 2001)
Dustin Redington - Bass (1998 - 1999)
Dean Duval - Guitar (1998 - 1999)

Timeline

Discography

Split releases

Extended plays

Compilation albums

Compilation Appearances

References

External links
Level Plane information regarding Usurp Synapse (Archived)
Old Usurp Synapse Index (Archived)
Official Myspace page (Archive)

Musical groups from Indiana
American screamo musical groups
American emo musical groups
Musical groups established in 1998
Musical groups disestablished in 2001
Powerviolence groups
Level Plane Records artists